The 1952 United States Senate election in Pennsylvania was held on November 4, 1952. Incumbent Republican U.S. Senator Edward Martin successfully sought re-election to another term, defeating the Democratic nominee, Guy K. Bard.

General election

Candidates
Guy K. Bard, Judge of the United States District Court for the Eastern District of Pennsylvania (Democratic)
Anna Chester (Militant Workers)
Frank Knotek (Independent Government)
Edward Martin, incumbent U.S. Senator (Republican)
Ira S. Sassaman (Prohibition)
William J. Van Essen (Socialist)

Results

References

Pennsylvania
1952
1952 Pennsylvania elections